Toni Phillips is a British DJ, blogger and national radio presenter currently hosting the 1-4 pm slot on Capital XTRA excluding Saturday.

Phillips attended Sylvia Young's Theatre School, before entering the broadcasting industry aged 19 as the Entertainment Reporter for South Coast radio station Power FM. She gained popularity in the south for her jovial nature, and was asked to play 'Jasmine' at the King's Theatre in Hampshire, alongside Dean Gaffney and Syd Little in the pantomime Aladdin.

Having hosted the mid-morning show for KISS 100 for over two years, Phillips was approached to join Capital FM Network. She joined Capital XTRA as a weekday presenter in early 2014, and extended this to Sundays in mid-2016.

Phillips is also a DJ who has performed at the Glastonbury, Isle of Wight Festival and Bestival music festivals. She has hosted entertainment coverage on Nuts TV, and 'The Sunday Roast' on MTV.

Phillips is also widely known as being the brains behind the popular London blog, LostItGirl, something she admits to having played a part in at some point. However, the true identity of the LostItGirl remains a point of debate among the blog's followers.

References

British radio presenters
Living people
Year of birth missing (living people)